The NLGI consistency number (sometimes called “NLGI grade”) expresses a measure of the relative hardness of a grease used for lubrication, as specified by the standard classification of lubricating grease established by the National Lubricating Grease Institute (NLGI). Reproduced in standards 
The NLGI consistency number is also a component of the code specified in standard  “lubricants, industrial oils and related products (class L) — classification — part 9: family X (greases)”.

The NLGI consistency number alone is not sufficient for specifying the grease required by a particular application. Besides consistency, other properties (such as structural and mechanical stability, apparent viscosity, resistance to oxidation, etc.) can be tested to determine the suitability of a grease to a specific application.

Test method

NLGI's classification defines nine grades, each associated to a range of ASTM worked penetration values, measured using the test defined by standard  “cone penetration of lubricating grease”. This involves two test apparatus. The first apparatus consists of a closed container and a piston-like plunger. The face of the plunger is perforated to allow grease to flow from one side of the plunger to another as the plunger is worked up and down.

Once worked, the grease is placed in a penetration test apparatus. This apparatus consists of a container, a specially-configured cone and a dial indicator. The container is filled with the grease and the top surface of the grease is smoothed over. The cone is placed so that its tip just touches the grease surface and the dial indicator is set to zero at this position. When the test starts, the weight of the cone will cause it to penetrate into the grease. After a specific time interval the depth of penetration is measured.

Classification

The following table shows the NLGI classification and compares each grade with household products of similar consistency. 

Common greases are in the range 1 through 3. Those with a NLGI No. of 000 to 1 are used in low viscosity applications. Examples include enclosed gear drives operating at low speeds and open gearing. Grades 0, 1 and 2 are used in highly loaded gearing. Grades 1 through 4 are often used in rolling contact bearings. Greases with a higher number are firmer, tend to stay in place and are a good choice when leakage is a concern.

References

Lubricants